Brontolaemus is a genus of beetles in the family Laemophloeidae that is found only in the Hawaiian Islands. The members of the genus are notable for their large size relative to most other laemophloeids, and their extremely long antennae that may be twice as long as the body. The genus contains the following species:

 Brontolaemus agilis Sharp
 Brontolaemus currax Sharp
 Brontolaemus elegans Sharp
 Brontolaemus nudicornis Sharp

References

Laemophloeidae
Cucujoidea genera